Emerging adulthood and early adulthood (also called young adulthood) is the stage of life between adolescence and full-fledged adulthood.

Early adulthood or young adulthood may also refer to:
 Young adulthood stage in Erik Erikson's model between early and middle adulthood.
 Late adolescence, the last stages of biological, cognitive, and social development that occur during adolescence.
 Age of majority, the legal age of adulthood.